The 2006 FIM Motocross World Championship was the 50th F.I.M. Motocross Racing World Championship season. In the MX1 class, Stefan Everts took his tenth world title in what was his final season in before retirement. In the MX2 class Christophe Pourcel won his one and only world title, while in MX3 Yves Demaria took his second crown.

MX1

Calendar and Results

Riders Championship

MX2

Calendar and Results

Riders Championship

MX3

Calendar and Results

Riders Championship

References 

2006 in motorcycle sport
Motocross World Championship seasons